Littlehampton railway station is in Littlehampton in the county of West Sussex, England. The station and the trains serving it are operated by Southern, and at peak times also by Thameslink.

The station is a terminus at the end of a short branch off the West Coastway line. It currently has 4 platforms, two of which are of twelve carriage length, one of eight carriage length and one of seven carriage length. It is served by Class 313 and Class 377 "Electrostar" trains, and at peak times also by Class 700.

History 

A station called Arundel & Littlehampton opened in 1846 on the main Brighton–Portsmouth Line. This closed shortly after the branch line to the town itself opened in August 1863, when a west-facing connection was made at Ford Junction. In 1887, the third side of the triangle was constructed, allowing through running from the lines from Horsham on the Mid-Sussex railways and Brighton.  The south junction was named Littlehampton Junction, while the eastern connection was named Arundel Junction.

A station building similar to that at Arundel was provided; this lasted until 1937, after which redevelopment was severely delayed by the Second World War and planning disputes.  One original structure remained until 1986, when Network SouthEast started building a new concourse and ticket office. This was finished late in 1987, and was officially unveiled on 15 January 1988.  The line was electrified in 1938, with an official unveiling ceremony being held on 30 June 1938.  The station handled goods traffic until 1970.

In 2021, the station received a Silent Soldier flat sculpture as a gift from East Preston Parish Council. The sculpture is placed by the trackside floral beds.

Carriage Shed and Stabling Sidings 

A locomotive shed was also provided. Built with the station, it also went out of use in 1937 when the line was electrified.  Currently in use at Littlehampton is a carriage shed used to store, maintain and clean Class 377 'Electrostars' and Class 313s; more recently next to the shed, two more sidings have been fitted with waste disposal facilities to empty train toilets and are used to store trains over night. Two more sidings were constructed for train storage. Also present is a train washer and siding for trains to dry in. Light maintenance jobs can also be carried out on trains at Littlehampton.

Services 
Off-peak, all services at Littlehampton are operated by Southern using  and  EMUs.

The typical off-peak service in trains per hour is:
 2 tph to  via 
 1 tph to 
 1 tph to 

On Sundays, the service to Portsmouth & Southsea does not run and the service to London Victoria is reduced to hourly.

Facilities 
Littlehampton Railway Station has the following facilities:
Ticket Office 
Ticket Machines
Station Buffet
Waiting Room
Toilets
Telephones
Information points
Waiting Area
4 platforms
Sheltered seating around the whole station
Taxi Rank 
Car Park (38 spaces)
Bicycle storage 
Bus stops

Accidents 

On 4 August 1920, the 13.10 train from Ford had a brake failure. The train hauled by D1 Class locomotive No.360, hit the buffer stops, demolishing them, going through the station and Albert Road, eventually coming to rest in Franciscan Way. There were about thirty passengers in the train, of whom thirteen suffered from minor injuries, or from the effects of shock. The driver and fireman escaped injury by jumping from the foot-plate just before the collision occurred.
On 30 November 1949, two passenger trains formed of electric multiple units collided at Littlehampton due to errors by a driver and guard on one of the trains and the Littlehampton signalman. Eleven people were injured.

References

External links 

Railway stations in West Sussex
DfT Category D stations
Former London, Brighton and South Coast Railway stations
Railway stations in Great Britain opened in 1863
Railway stations served by Govia Thameslink Railway
Littlehampton